Tiruchirappalli is the fourth largest city in the Indian state of Tamil Nadu, situated 322 kilometres south of Chennai and is almost situated at the geographic centre of the state. The city houses the Trichy railway division, and is served by several railway stations, of which the most prominent one being the Tiruchirappalli Junction, which is connected by 5 different branches towards Thanjavur, Pudukottai, Dindigul, Karur and Virudhachalam. Tiruchirappalli has rail connectivity with most important cities and towns in India.

List of railway stations in Tiruchirappalli

See also
 Transport in Tiruchirappalli

References

Railway stations in Tiruchirappalli
Tiruchirappalli